At least two ships of the Brazilian Navy have borne the name Piauí

 , a  launched in 1868 and scrapped in 1893
 , a  launched in 1908 and stricken in 1944

Brazilian Navy ship names